Mackenzie Dale Barry (born 11 April 2001) is a football player who has represented New Zealand at U-17 and Under-20 age group levels and the senior New Zealand women's national football team. She plays club football for Wellington Phoenix FC in Australia's A-League Women competition.

Club career
Mackenzie Barry was born on 11 April 2001 in New Plymouth, Taranaki and attended Central Primary School where she began playing football. Barry then attended and played for New Plymouth Girls' High School and represented Taranaki and CentralFootball Federation before being signed for Wellington Phoenix for their inaugural season in the A-League.

International career
Barry was a member of the New Zealand squad in the FIFA U-17 Women's World Cup in Uruguay where New Zealand finished in 3rd place,.

In 2019 Barry was part of the winning side at the 2019 OFC U-19 Women's Championship, earning qualification for the 2020 FIFA U-20 Women's World Cup scheduled to be held in Costa Rica, although that tournament was subsequently cancelled due to the Covid 19 pandemic.

Barry was first called up to the senior side for a Europe tour to play Norway and Wales and 
made her senior international debut on 19 October 2022 coming on as a substitute during a subsequent tour to Japan against the hosts, Japan winning that game 2-0.

References

External links
 

2001 births
Living people
New Zealand women's association footballers
New Zealand women's international footballers
California Golden Bears women's soccer players
Women's association football midfielders
People educated at New Plymouth Girls' High School
21st-century New Zealand women